Highway 753 is a highway in the Canadian province of Saskatchewan. It runs from Highway 9 near Hinchcliffe until the Manitoba border, where it continues as Provincial Road 275 near Crestview.

Highway 753 passes through the communities of Danbury, Arabella, and Whitebeech. Highway 753 intersects Highways 662, 8, and 661.

See also 
Roads in Saskatchewan
Transportation in Saskatchewan

References 

753